"Gekkouyoku" (Moonlight Bath) is Jun Shibata's 3rd single. It was released on June 26, 2002 and peaked at #34.

Track listing
Gekkouyoku (月光浴; Moonlight Bath)
Sora no Iro (空の色; Color of the Sky)

Charts

External links
https://web.archive.org/web/20161030094458/http://www.shibatajun.com/— Shibata Jun Official Website

2002 singles
Jun Shibata songs
2002 songs